Danya Sarah-Elenor Barsalona (born January 12, 1988) is a Canadian soccer player who plays as a midfielder for German club FC Viktoria Berlin.

She previously played for IL Sandviken in Norway's Toppserien, SD Lagunak in Spain's Primera División, for 1. FC Lübars and 1. FC Union Berlin in the German 2. Bundesliga and UPC Tavagnacco in Italy's Serie A. She attended and played for the University of Alabama at Birmingham from 2006 to 2010 in the United States's NCAA Division 1. She was also a member of the Canadian National Team.

Besides her football career she is working as a sports journalist with Deutsche Welle. Her brother, Andrew, is also a soccer player.

References

External links
 

1988 births
Living people
Canadian women's soccer players
U.P.C. Tavagnacco players
Serie A (women's football) players
Primera División (women) players
Toppserien players
SK Brann Kvinner players
Expatriate women's footballers in Italy
Expatriate women's footballers in Spain
Expatriate women's footballers in Norway
Expatriate women's footballers in Germany
Soccer players from Toronto
Canadian expatriate sportspeople in Italy
Canadian expatriate sportspeople in Norway
Canadian expatriate sportspeople in Spain
Canadian expatriate sportspeople in Germany
Canadian expatriate soccer players
UAB Blazers women's soccer players
USL W-League (1995–2015) players
Women's association football forwards
SD Lagunak (women) players